"Pop Club" was a hugely popular radio programme on the BBC World Service in the late 1960s. Presented by the radio broadcaster Tommy Vance dubbed "TV on the radio", each installment of the programme started with a song from Cliff Richard, the nominal president of the club.

Listeners to the BBC World Service from all over the world would apply to become members of Pop Cub receiving a membership card, special badges and gifts. Every week Tommy Vance would read listeners' letters and played requests with one being chosen as the "letter of the week".

Later on the hosting was taken over by Noel Edmonds and the 30-minute programme was extended to 45 minutes.

BBC World Service programmes